Kim Sol-ji (born 2 September 1989) is a South Korean rower. She competed in the women's lightweight double sculls event at the 2012 Summer Olympics.

References

1989 births
Living people
South Korean female rowers
Olympic rowers of South Korea
Rowers at the 2012 Summer Olympics
Sportspeople from Seoul
Asian Games medalists in rowing
Rowers at the 2010 Asian Games
Rowers at the 2014 Asian Games
Asian Games bronze medalists for South Korea
Medalists at the 2010 Asian Games